Arthur Prysock and Count Basie is a 1965 studio album by Arthur Prysock and Count Basie and his orchestra.

Track listing 
 "I Could Have Told You" (Carl Sigman, Jimmy Van Heusen) – 3:44
 "Ain't No Use" (Leroy Kirkland, Sidney Wyche) – 2:45
 "I Could Write a Book" (Lorenz Hart, Richard Rodgers) – 3:40
 "Gone Again" (Curley Hamner, Lionel Hampton, Curtis Lewis) – 3:09
 "Come Home" (Buddy Johnson) – 3:41
 "I Worry 'Bout You" (Norman Mapp) – 2:16
 "What Will I Tell My Heart?" (Irving Gordon, Jack Lawrence, Peter Tinturin) – 2:46
 "Don't Go to Strangers" (Redd Evans, Arthur Kent, Dave Mann) – 2:47
 "I'm Lost" (Otis René) – 3:21
 "I'm Gonna Sit Right Down and Write Myself a Letter"(Fred E. Ahlert, Joe Young) – 2:52
 "Come Rain or Come Shine" (Harold Arlen, Johnny Mercer) – 2:21
 "Where Are You?" (Harold Adamson, Jimmy McHugh) – 3:43 Bonus track on CD reissue; originally on Old Town LP 2011
 "Do Nothin' Till You Hear from Me" (Duke Ellington, Bob Russell) – 3:14 Bonus track on CD reissue; originally on Old Town LP 2011
 "Sunday" (Chester Conn, Benny Krueger, Nathan "Ned" Miller, Jule Styne) – 2:38 Bonus track on CD reissue; originally on Old Town LP 2011

Personnel 
 Arthur Prysock – vocal

The Count Basie Orchestra

 Count Basie – piano
 Sonny Cohn – trumpet
 Al Aarons
 Wallace Davenport
 Phil Guilbeau
 Grover Mitchell – trombone
 Bill Hughes
 Henderson Chambers
 Al Grey
 Henry Coker
 Marshal Royal – alto saxophone
 Bobby Plater
 Eric Dixon – tenor saxophone
 Eddie "Lockjaw" Davis
 Charlie Fowlkes – baritone saxophone
 Freddie Green – guitar
 Norman Keenan – double bass
 Rufus Jones – drums
 Grady Tate

References 

1965 albums
Arthur Prysock albums
Count Basie Orchestra albums
Verve Records albums